The 2015 Saudi Super Cup was the third edition of the Saudi Super Cup, an annual football match contested by the winners of the previous season's Saudi Pro League and King's Cup competitions. The match was played between Al-Nassr, the winner of the 2014–15 Saudi Pro League and Al-Hilal, the winner of the 2015 King Cup. The match was played on 12 August 2015.

Al-Hilal won 1–0 to win their first Super Cup, with a goal from Carlos Eduardo.

Match

Location and date changes
The 2015 Saudi Super Cup was originally scheduled to be played at King Fahd Stadium, in Riyadh on 14 August 2015, however The SAFF decided to change it to be held at Loftus Road Stadium, in London on 12 August 2015.

Details

Statistics

See also
 2015–16 Pro League
 2015–16 1st Division League
 2015–16 2nd Division League
 2016 King Cup
 2015–16 Crown Prince Cup

References

 Saudi Super Cup 2015 goalzz.com

Saudi Super Cup
Super Cup
Al Nassr FC matches
Al Hilal SFC matches
International club association football competitions hosted by London